Clive Baker (5 July 1934 – 20 February 2012) was an English professional footballer who played as a forward in the Football League for Doncaster Rovers, Halifax Town and Southport and in non-League football for Buxton.

Career
Born in Adwick le Street, West Riding of Yorkshire, Baker started his career with local youth side Intake before joining hometown club Doncaster Rovers in 1952. He failed to make an appearance for the club and joined Football League Third Division North side Halifax Town in 1955. In his four years with the club he made 58 league appearances scoring 22 goals. He left in 1959 to join Football League Fourth Division side Southport but failed to appear for the first team, leaving in 1960. He then dropped into non-league football with Cheshire County League side Buxton.

After retiring from full-time football he moved into coaching, where his first job was with Halifax Town. He later became first-team coach under manager Jim McAnearney at Rotherham United. He also spent time as a coach with Hartlepool United and York City, and served as caretaker manager at the latter from January to February 1975. He moved to Norway as a coach for a year in 1977. He also coached abroad in Canada, United States and South Africa. In November 1984, Sheffield Wednesday manager Howard Wilkinson appointed Baker to his backroom staff as chief scout. He stayed with the club for eighteen years working his way up to Youth Academy Director before retiring in 2001.

Death
Baker died on 20 February 2012 in Rotherham, South Yorkshire at the age of 77.

Managerial statistics

References

1934 births
2012 deaths
English footballers
Association football forwards
Doncaster Rovers F.C. players
Halifax Town A.F.C. players
Southport F.C. players
Buxton F.C. players
English Football League players
English football managers
York City F.C. managers
English Football League managers
Halifax Town A.F.C. non-playing staff
Rotherham United F.C. non-playing staff
Hartlepool United F.C. non-playing staff
York City F.C. non-playing staff
Sheffield Wednesday F.C. non-playing staff